Lubianka, rural localities and hydronyms in Poland and Ukraine, may refer to:

Places

Poland 
Lubianka, Warmian-Masurian Voivodeship (north Poland)
Lubianka, West Pomeranian Voivodeship (north-west Poland)

Ukraine 
 Lubianka, Dnipropetrovsk Oblast, a village
 Lubianka, Bila Tserkva Raion, Kyiv Oblast, a village
 Lubianka, Bucha Raion, Kyiv Oblast, a village
 Lubianka, Vasylkiv Raion, Kyiv Oblast, a village
 Lubianka, Luhansk Oblast, a village
 Lubianka, Mykolaiv Oblast, a village

Hydronyms 
Lubianka (lake) (north-west Poland)
Lubianka (reservoir) (east-central Poland)
Lubianka River (Świętokrzyskie Voivodeship) (east-central Poland)
Lubianka River (Warmian-Masurian Voivodeship) (north-east Poland)

See also 
Łubianka (disambiguation)
Lubyanka (disambiguation)

uk:Луб'янка